is the sixth single by Japanese idol duo Wink. Written by Takashi Matsumoto, Steve Lironi, and Dan Navarro, the single was released on November 1, 1989 by Polystar Records.

Background and release 
"One Night in Heaven (Mayonaka no Angel)" was the first original Wink song to be co-written by foreign musicians. The song was used by Panasonic for their Maclord Movie NV-M10 camcorder commercial. It was also used as the ending theme of the TBS drama special .

"One Night in Heaven (Mayonaka no Angel)" became Wink's fourth No. 1 on the Oricon's weekly charts. It sold over 423,000 copies and was certified Platinum by the RIAJ.

Track listing 
All lyrics are written by Takashi Matsumoto; all music is arranged by Motoki Funayama.

Chart positions 
Weekly charts

Year-end charts

Certifications

References

External links 
 
 

1989 singles
1989 songs
Wink (duo) songs
Japanese-language songs
Songs with lyrics by Takashi Matsumoto (lyricist)
Oricon Weekly number-one singles